Yunusemre is a planned district and second level municipality in Manisa Province, Turkey. According to Law act no 6360, all Turkish provinces with a population more than 750,000, will be metropolitan municipalities and the districts within the metropolitan municipalities will be second level municipalities. The law also creates new districts within the provinces in addition to present districts. These changes will be effective by the local elections in 2014. 

After 2014, what is now Manisa central district will be split into two. A part will be named Yunusemre and the name Manisa will be reserved for the metropolitan municipality. (Yunus Emre was a Turkish poet of the 13th and 14th centuries.)

Rural area
There are 3 towns and 62 villages in the rural area of Yunusemre district. Now their official status became "neighborhood of Yunusemre".

References

Districts of Manisa Province